Tonight's the Night is a 1932 British comedy film directed by Monty Banks and starring Leslie Fuller, Amy Veness and Charles Farrell. The screenplay concerns a man who is wrongly imprisoned for theft and escapes from jail and tracks down the real culprit. It is also known by the alternative title Tonight's the Night: Pass It On. Leslie Arliss was a co-screenwriter. It was shot at the Elstree Studios of British International Pictures.

Cast
 Leslie Fuller as Bill Smithers
 Amy Veness as Emily Smithers
 Charles Farrell as Williams
 Frank Perfitt as Major Allington
 Syd Crossley as Warder Jackson
 Hal Walters as Alf Hawkins
 Hal Gordon as Smiler
 Betty Fields as Miss Winterbottom
 René Ray as Rose Smithers
 Monty Banks as Convict

References

Bibliography
 Low, Rachael. Filmmaking in 1930s Britain. George Allen & Unwin, 1985.
 Wood, Linda. British Films, 1927-1939. British Film Institute, 1986.

External links

1932 films
1932 comedy films
Films shot at British International Pictures Studios
1930s English-language films
Films directed by Monty Banks
British comedy films
British black-and-white films
1930s British films